Aurelio's rock lizard (Iberolacerta aurelioi) is a species of lizard in the family Lacertidae. The species is endemic to the Iberian peninsula.

Etymology
The specific name, aurelioi, is in honor of Aurelio Arribas, the father of the original describer of this species, Oscar J. Arribas.

Geographic range
I. aurelioi is found in a small area near the confluence of Andorra, Spain and France.

Habitat

Description

Reproduction
I. aurelioi is oviparous.

Conservation status
I. aurelioi is threatened by habitat loss.

References

Further reading
Arnold EN, Arribas O, Carranza S (2007). "Systematics of the Palaearctic and Oriental lizard tribe Lacertini (Squamata: Lacertidae: Lacertinae), with descriptions of eight new genera". Zootaxa 1430: 1–86. (Iberolacerta aurelioi, new combination).
Arribas O (1994). "Una nueva especie de Lagartija de los Pirineos Orientales: Lacerta (Archaeolacerta) aurelioi sp. nov. (Reptilia: Lacertidae)". Bollettino del Museo Regionale di Scienze Naturale, Torino 12 (1): 327–351. (Lacerta aurelioi, new species). (in Spanish, with an abstract in English).
García-Roa R, Iglesias-Carrasco M, Garin-Barrio I, Cabido C (2015). "Communal oviposition of Iberolacerta aurelioi (Squamata: Lacertidae) in the Spanish Pyrenees". Salamandra 51 (1): 61–62.

Iberolacerta
Endemic reptiles of the Iberian Peninsula
Reptiles described in 1994
Taxa named by Oscar J. Arribas
Taxonomy articles created by Polbot